Floral Jamming is a floral design activity originating from Hong Kong, where participants design their own original sculpture with floral materials.  The floral designer provides all materials required for the floral display including flowers and foliage. Participants select the materials to create their own floral creation within a set time.

Floral Jamming

The mission of Floral Jamming is to promote floral art to the general public. Participants of Floral Jamming are usually beginners who have little to no experience in floral arrangement or floral design. A key feature of Floral Jamming is that the sessions must be conducted by a floral designer with professional certification.

Through Floral Jamming, these participants can assemble a final floral product under professional guidance without having taken any classes. During a Floral Jamming session, the floral designer only provides guidance upon participants’ request. Based on the individual participants’ design, the floral designer could make suggestions on how to refine the arrangement.

Floral Jamming is also educational.  It can introduce concepts of nature and design to young participants. It is an activity that can enhance family bonding and interpersonal skills.

Many Floral Jammers have commented that the process of focusing on producing their own individual creation has helped them to distress.

Origin 

The first Floral Jamming was held at Tallensia Floral Art, Hong Kong on July 1, 2011.

Founder 
Floral Jamming was founded by Lowdi Kwan, a floral designer with certification from the American Institute of Floral Designers in 1996.

Benefits of Floral Jamming 

Psychological research has shown that the art of floral arrangement can help relieve mood swings, improve cognitive and perceptive functions and enhance social skills.

Bearing this in mind Kwan thought of the concept of Floral Jamming.

Sessions 
Prior to the session, materials including the necessary tools and accessories would be displayed. To start off a session a floral designer will give a brief introduction on the materials and on how to start a floral arrangement by introducing the fundamental principles of floral arrangement. The participants will then select flowers and other floral materials to construct their own floral arrangement.  The floral designer will provide assistance and technical support throughout the session. It is important to note that the floral designer will only provide guidance/ suggestion upon request as a support and not to change the participants’ individual design.

Floral Jamming has been organized for functions such as birthday parties, bridal showers, school fairs, corporate team building and charity events.

References 

Floristry